A log house moulder is a machine to prepare logs to be suitable for building a log home. In general, the logs are first sawn to a square beam, then the moulder makes the groove. Often fitted to a portable sawmill that enables direct profiling of round or squared logs. The log house moulder is usually powered by electricity, but for portable sawmills they are sometimes using a chainsaw as power head. One of the more common, especially in Europe, is the
Logosol log house moulder.

Other type of log house moulder is a log through-pass machine. Through-pass log home moulders are highly productive and mighty machines able to turn truck load of logs into house logs during a work shift. Barked or debarked green or dry logs are fed into such machine one after other on one side and the machine processes logs, turning them into profiled roundish or squarish house logs, taken from outfeed of the machine. Such log home milling machine can shape logs into different profiles: Swedish cope, Tongue&groove, D-log, bevel-edged logs, etc.
One of moulders of through-pass type are Woodlandia' Rotary Log Moulders (USA, Canada, Russia)

Woodworking